The Origins and History of Consciousness is a 1949 book by the psychologist and philosopher Erich Neumann, in which the author attempts to "outline the archetypal stages in the development of consciousness". It was first published in English in 1954 in a translation by R. F. C. Hull. The work has been seen as an important and enduring contribution to Jungian thought.

Summary

Neumann describes the book as an attempt to "outline the archetypal stages in the development of consciousness", explaining that it is based on depth psychology, specifically the analytical psychology of the psychiatrist Carl Jung. He discusses subjects including mythology, including the figure of Osiris, archetypes, such as that of the Great Mother, matriarchy, ontogeny and phylogeny, the collective unconscious, a psychological process he refers to as "centroversion", masculinity, femininity, and homosexuality. He maintains that, "Consciousness, as such, is masculine even in women, just as the unconscious is feminine in men." He writes that male homosexuality almost always involves "a matriarchal psychology where the Great Mother is unconsciously in the ascendant."

The book includes a foreword by Jung, who praises it and compares its emphasis on "matriarchal symbolism", and use of the symbol of the ouroboros, to his own work. Jung credits Neumann with making a valuable contribution to a psychology of the unconscious by placing the concepts of analytical psychology on an evolutionary basis.

Publication history
The Origins and History of Consciousness was first published in 1949 by Rascher Verlag. In 1954, it was published in R. F. C. Hull's English translation by Princeton University Press.

Reception
The psychologist James Hillman argued that Neumann's "Apollonic definition of consciousness" led him to mistakenly conclude that consciousness as such is masculine even in women. The philosopher Walter Kaufmann singled out The Origins and History of Consciousness as a "perfect illustration" of the "utterly tedious, pointless erudition coupled with a stunning lack of even elementary concern with objections and alternatives" that distinguishes "most of the literature on archetypes and the collective unconscious". He described Neumann as dogmatic and accused him of operating "with a notion of evidence" similar to that of theologians who prove points with biblical verses. He criticized him for failing to consider diffusion as an alternative explanation for the presence of a given phenomenon in multiple cultures. The book has been described as "Jungianism at its learned best" by the critic Camille Paglia, who identified it as an influence on her work of literary criticism Sexual Personae (1990) and her personal favorite among Neumann's works. She described Neumann's theory of "centroversion" as "idiosyncratic."

Hopcke called The Origins and History of Consciousness, along with The Great Mother (1955), "Neumann's most enduring contribution to Jungian thought". He noted that Neumann's view of homosexuality is neither original nor intended to be original, and differs relatively little from that of Jung. The psychiatrist Anthony Stevens called The Origins and History of Consciousness, "a great but misguided book". Stevens argues that Neumann's assumptions that ontogeny recapitulates phylogeny, that preliterate human beings were "unconscious", and that Western consciousness has been subjected to different selection pressures to that of other civilized populations, are fallacious and biologically untenable.

References

Bibliography
Books

 
 
 
 
 
 
 
 

1949 non-fiction books
Books by Erich Neumann
Books about consciousness
German non-fiction books
Mythology books
Princeton University Press books